Clover May Murray (born 6 October 1997) is a British professional racing cyclist, who currently rides for UCI Women's Continental Team .

References

External links

1997 births
Living people
British female cyclists
Place of birth missing (living people)
21st-century British women